Smoko is a short break taken during work or military duty.

Smoko may also refer to:

 "Smoko" (song), by the Chats, 2017
 Smoko, Victoria, a locality in Australia